In Scotland there is one national association football league, the Scottish Professional Football League (SPFL). The SPFL was formed in 2013 by the merger of the Scottish Premier League and the Scottish Football League. The SPFL consists of 42 clubs and has four divisions, named the Premiership, Championship, League One and League Two. Below this there are two regional leagues (Highland Football League and Lowland Football League), with a promotion and relegation play-off between the regional leagues and the national league. This article lists stadiums that have been used for SPFL matches.

Stadiums

See also
List of football stadiums in Scotland
List of Scottish Football League stadiums
List of Scottish Premier League stadiums
Scotland national football team home stadium
Scottish football attendance records
 Scottish stadium moves

Notes

References

 
Scottish Professional Football League